The commune of Kibago is a commune of Makamba Province in southern Burundi. The capital lies at Kibago.

References

Communes of Burundi
Makamba Province